Manuel Ramírez Gómez (1942-2014) was a Colombian economist specializing in applied microeconomics. He was the director of the research center at the Economics Department in Universidad del Rosario. He was director of economic research at Econometria Ltda., president of Academia Colombiana de Ciencias Económicas, and co-founder of Asociación Colombiana de Economía de la Salud.

References

See more
 Website at Universidad del Rosario

1942 births
Living people
Colombian economists